Edward Barrett Curteis was an English Whig politician.

He sat in the House of Commons of the United Kingdom for 5 years between 1832 and 1837.  He was  Member of Parliament (MP) for Rye, Sussex.

References

Members of the Parliament of the United Kingdom for English constituencies
Whig (British political party) MPs for English constituencies
UK MPs 1832–1835
UK MPs 1835–1837